This is a list of terrestrial, satellite and internet radio stations which identify themselves as playing jazz in any of its forms (mainstream, traditional, fusion, acid, and smooth, among others), or have substantial jazz programming, that can be heard in the United States.

References 
 

 
Jazz
Radio Stations